Conus freitasi is a species of sea snail, a marine gastropod mollusk in the family Conidae, the cone snails, cone shells or cones.

These snails are predatory and venomous. They are capable of "stinging" humans.

Description
The length of the shell varies between 10.8 mm and 15.9 mm.

Distribution
This marine species of cone snail occurs off the Cape Verdes.

References

External links
 Tenorio M.J., Afonso C.M.L., Rolán E., Pires S., Vasconcelos P., Abalde S. & Zardoya R. (2017). DNA sequences disclose a new species of Africonus cone snail from São Vicente (Gastropoda: Conidae). Zoologia Caboverdiana. 6(2): 32-41

freitasi
Gastropods described in 2018
Gastropods of Cape Verde
Fauna of São Vicente, Cape Verde